Abel's sum formula may refer to:

 Abel's summation formula, a formula used in number theory to compute series
 Summation by parts, a transformation of the summation of products of sequences into other summations